Round the Horn (stylized with a leading apostrophe as 'Round the Horn) is a 1979 video game written by Reverend George Blank and published by The Software Exchange for the TRS-80. Written in BASIC, it was originally a type-in program—and the cover feature—in the January 1979 issue of SoftSide.

Contents
Round the Horn is a game in which each player becomes the pilot of a clipper ship in the late 19th century with instructions to sail from New York City, around the tip of South America, and north to San Francisco in the shortest possible time.

Reception
Joseph Suchar reviewed Round the Horn in The Space Gamer No. 37. Suchar commented that "Round the Horn is a challenging game which is in between all of those economic games and the simplistic arcade games. I highly recommend it."

References

External links
SoftSide review

1979 video games
Naval video games
Simulation video games
TRS-80 games
TRS-80-only games
Video games developed in the United States
Video games set in the 19th century